Carrot Creek is an unincorporated community in central Alberta in Yellowhead County, located  south of Highway 16, about  east of Edson and  west of Edmonton.

References

Localities in Yellowhead County